The 9th Central People's Committee (CPC) of North Korea was elected by the 1st Session of the 8th Supreme People's Assembly on 26 May 1990. The CPC was abolished and replaced on 6 September 1998 by the 10th National Defence Commission.

Members

References

Citations

Bibliography
Books:
 

9th Supreme People's Assembly
Central People's Committee
1990 establishments in North Korea
1998 disestablishments in North Korea